Contact between Geoffrey Chaucer and the Italian humanists Petrarch or Boccaccio has been proposed by scholars for centuries. More recent scholarship tends to discount these earlier speculations because of lack of evidence. As Leonard Koff remarks, the story of their meeting is "a 'tydying' worthy of Chaucer himself".

Chaucer's trips to mainland Europe 

There are government records that show Chaucer was absent from England visiting Genoa and Florence from December 1372 until the middle of 1373. He went with Sir James de Provan and John de Mari, eminent merchants hired by the king, and some soldiers and servants. During this Italian business trip for the king to arrange for a settlement of Genoese merchants these scholars say it is likely that sometime in 1373 Chaucer made contact with Petrarch or Boccaccio.

Milan 1368: The wedding of the Duke of Clarence and Violante Visconti
They believe it plausible that Chaucer not only met Petrarch at this wedding but also Boccaccio. This view today, however, is far from universally accepted. William T. Rossiter, in his 2010 book on Chaucer and Petrarch argues that the key evidence supporting a visit to the continent in this year is a warrant permitting Chaucer to pass at Dover, dated 17 July. No destination is given, but even if this does represent a trip to Milan, he would have missed not only the wedding, but also Petrarch, who had returned to Pavia on 3 July.

Canterbury Tales

The Clerk's Tale 

However, this does not mean necessarily that Chaucer himself met Petrarch.

Other works

The Legend of Good Women 
Chaucer followed the general plan of Boccaccio's work On Famous Women in The Legend of Good Women.

Alternative viewpoints 

The Knight's Tale uses Boccaccio's Teseida and the Filostrato is the major source of Troilus and Creseyde.

Footnotes

Sources 
 
 American Society for the Extension of University Teaching, The Citizen, Volume 3, American Society for the Extension of University Teaching, 1898, University of Michigan
 Bell, G. & Sons, 1912, The age of Chaucer (1346–1400), p. 152, Indiana University
 
 
 Brown, Peter, A companion to Chaucer, pp. 454–456, Wiley-Blackwell, 2002, 
 
 Chambers, Robert, Cyclopaedia of English literature: a selection of the choicest productions of English authors from the earliest to the present time, World Publishing House, 1875, from HUP
 Chaucer, Geoffrey, The works of Geoffrey Chaucer, Publisher Macmillan, 1898, Harvard University
 
 
  at Internet Archive
 
 
 Crow, Martin M. et al., Chaucer Life-records, Clarendon Press, 1966. It includes materials such as receipts for his travels in Italy, copies of commissions, etc.
 
 
 Edmunds, Edward William,  Chaucer & his poetry, Volume 26 of Poetry & life series, p. 50, C.G. Harrap & Company, 1914
 
 
 
 Garnett, Richard, English literature : an illustrated record, Heinemann, 1906, from University of Michigan
 
 Gosse, Edmund, English literature : an illustrated record, p. 137, Heinemann, 1906. University of Michigan
 
 
 
 Hammond, Eleanor Prescott, Chaucer: a bibliographical manual, p. 306, The Macmillan Company, 1908
 
 
 Hunt, Leigh, Leigh Hunt's London journal, Volumes 1–2, C. Knight, 1834
 Hutton, Edward, Giovanni Boccaccio: a biographical study, J. Lane, 1910, University of California
 James Clarke & Co., The literary world, Volume 21, 1880, p. 251, Princeton University
 Jenks, Tudor, In the days of Chaucer, p. 144, A. S. Barnes & company, 1904, Harvard University
 Johns Hopkins University, Modern language notes, Volume 12 No. 1, Johns Hopkins Press, 1897
 Jusserand, J.J., The Twentieth century, Volume 39, The Nineteenth Century and After, 1896, pp. 993–1005, detailed analysis of Chaucer coming in contact with Petrarch in 1373. UOM
 Koff, Leonard Michael. "Introduction". The Decameron and the Canterbury Tales: New Essays on an Old Question. Madison: Fairleigh Dickinson University Press, 2000.
 Langer, William Leonard, An encyclopaedia of world history, ancient, medieval and modern ..., Volume 1, p. 267, Houghton Mifflin Co., 1948
 
 
 Rutherford, Mildred Lewis, French authors: a hand-book of French literature , p. 39, The Franklin Printing and Publishing Company, 1906, Princeton University
 Schibanoff, Susan, Chaucer's queer poetics: rereading the dream trio,  p. 316, University of Toronto Press, 2006, 
 
 
 
 
 Stearns, Peter N. The Encyclopedia of world history: ancient, medieval, and modern, p. 240, Houghton Mifflin Harcourt, 2001, 
 
 Tatlock, John Strong Perry, The development and chronology of Chaucer's works, Pub. for the Chaucer society, by K. Paul, Trench, Trübner & co., limited, 1907
 
 Wallace, David, Giovanni Boccaccio, Decameron, pp. 48, 110–112, Cambridge University Press, 1991, 
 Ward, Sir Adolphus William, Chaucer, pp. 73–74, MacMillan and Company limited, 1907, University of California
 
 White, William, Notes and queries, Volume 96, p. 284, Oxford University Press, 1897
 
 
 
 

The Canterbury Tales
Geoffrey Chaucer
Italian